The Royal Oak Hotel is a public house and hotel in Market Place in Garstang, Lancashire, England. A Grade II listed building, the pub is owned by Robinsons Brewery.

It is rendered with sandstone dressings and a slate roof.  There are two storeys and five bays with a plinth and quoins.  The windows are sashes; they and the doorway have rusticated surrounds.

Gallery

See also
Listed buildings in Garstang

References

Sources

External links
Official website of the Royal Oak Hotel

Pubs in Lancashire
Buildings and structures in Garstang
Grade II listed buildings in Lancashire
19th-century establishments in England
Restaurants in Lancashire
Hotels in Lancashire